Fengolo (also spelled Fangolo) is a town in north-western Ivory Coast. It is a sub-prefecture of Madinani Department in Kabadougou Region, Denguélé District.

Fengolo was a commune until March 2012, when it became one of 1126 communes nationwide that were abolished.

In 2014, the population of the sub-prefecture of Fengolo was 5,929.

Villages
The 5 villages of the sub-prefecture of Fengolo and their population in 2014 are

 Fengolo  (2 467)
 Kakoro  (812)
 Tiébala  (549)
 Tiolasso  (1 061)
 Tiomozomon  (1 040)

References

Sub-prefectures of Kabadougou
Former communes of Ivory Coast